All That Matters is a comedy play by the British writer Charles McEvoy.

It ran for 45 performances between 8 February and 18 March 1911 at the Haymarket Theatre in London's West End. The original cast included Phyllis Neilson-Terry, Norman Trevor, C.V. France, J. Fisher White, Norman Page, Clare Greet, Helen Haye and Sydney Fairbrother.

References

Bibliography
 Wearing, J.P. The London Stage 1910-1919: A Calendar of Productions, Performers, and Personnel. Scarecrow Press, 2013.

1911 plays
West End plays
British plays
Plays set in England
Comedy plays